In power engineering, winding factor  provides a way to compare of the effectiveness of different designs of stators for alternators.  Winding factor is the ratio of electromotive force (EMF) produced by a stator having a short-pitch,  distributed, or skewed winding,  with a stator having full-pitch, concentrated, and non-skewed, windings.  

For most alternators, the stator acts as the armature.  Winding factor also applies to other electric machines, but this article focuses on winding factor as it applies to alternators.

Practical alternators have a short-pitched and distributed windings to reduce harmonics and maintain constant torque.  Also, either the stator or rotor may be slightly skewed from the rotor's axis to reduce cogging torque.   The armature winding of each phase may be distributed in a number of pole slots.  Since the EMF induced in different slots are not in phase, their phasor sum is less than their numerical sum.  This reduction factor is called distribution factor .  The other factors that can reduce the winding factor are pitch factor  and skew factor .

Pitch 
In alternator design, pitch means angle.  The shaft makes a complete rotation in 360 degrees, and is called mechanical degrees.  However, the current in a conductors makes a complete cycle in 360 electrical degrees. Electrical degrees and mechanical degrees are related as follows:

where P is the number of poles.

No matter how many poles, each pole always spans exactly 180 electrical degrees, and it is called pole pitch.  Coil pitch is the number of electrical degrees spanned by the coil.

Short pitch factor 
A full-pitched coil is 180 electrical degrees, meaning it spans the entire pole.  A short-pitched coil is less than 180 electrical degrees, meaning it does not spans the entire pole.  The amount the coil is short-pitched is given by the variable  in electrical degrees:

, and the pitch factor is:

.

A short pitched coil is also called chorded, in reference to the chord of a circle.

Calculating winding factor 
The winding factor can be calculated as 

where 
 is the distribution factor.
 is the pole factor.
 is the skew factor resulting from the winding being skewed from the axis of the rotor.

Example 
For a 3-phase 6 slot 4 pole non-overlapping winding alternator: 
 

Most of 3-phase motors have winding factor values between 0.85 and 0.95.

The winding factor (along with some other factors like winding skew) can help to improve the harmonic content in the generated EMF of the machine.

References

Saadat, Hadi. 2004. Power Systems Analysis. 2nd Ed. McGraw Hill. International Edition.

Reducing the effect of total harmonics distortion of synchronous machines
Electric motor winding calculator, 2022, Emetor AB
Kencoil, glossary
Reading a winding diagram
A Comparative Study on Performance of 3kW Induction Motor with Different Shapes of Stator Slots

Electrical generators